Man-E-Faces is a fictional character from the Masters of the Universe franchise. He is a member of the Heroic Warriors, notable by his distinctive appearance, with his large, blue metal head on which his faces appear in its screen-like opening. His ability is to change his face from that of a guy to that of a robot and a monster. 

The purposes for which he uses his faces have varied throughout different media. Initially conceived as someone cursed with a split personality, in the two cartoon series he uses his faces for the purpose of playing different roles as well as accessing additional powers. The original figure's tagline was "Heroic Human... Robot... Monster".

Character history

Original character
After the initial wave (1982), Man-E-Faces was one of the first characters conceived for the second wave (1983). The toy's 'feature' has a dial on the top of his head that can be rotated, allowing one of three faces (guy, monster or robot) to be visible at the front of his helmet. 

The figure came with an orange laser gun, making him one of the few characters from the line to carry a firearm. This gun was later recycled (in the same color) in the Weapons Pak. The purple detailing of his armor can also be found to vary on some foreign versions. 

An early release of the figure came with a bonus selection of weapons. These were originally included in the Castle Grayskull play set and were presented in a maroon dye. This release has been dubbed "Man-E-Weapons" by fans and is a sought after release on the collectors market.

The character was showcased in the mini-comic "The Ordeal of Man-E-Faces". In this story, he is an actor who is captured by Skeletor and made to drink a potion which changes him into a vicious monster which attacks everyone it sees. The Sorceress involves herself and changes Man-E-Faces back to a guy, but Skeletor asserts his dominance and turns Man-E back into the monster. The struggle creates a third persona, a super-intelligent robot which is neither good nor evil. Although He-Man manages to free Man-E-Faces from Skeletor's spell, the robot and monster remain permanent parts of his character. He-Man vows to fight until Man-E is free from the curse. This version of the character also appears in the DC Comics miniseries, and the early UK annuals also present him in such way.

1980s cartoon series
In He-Man and the Masters of the Universe by Filmation, the portrayal of Man-E-Faces is somewhat changed. Rather than having a split personality, he is an actor who uses his alternate faces primarily for the purpose of playing roles on stage. He is also able to change to numerous other faces alongside his robot and monster faces. 

He is given an origin episode early in the series titled "The Mystery of Man-E-Faces". This episode reveals that he was originally a villain who terrorized others with his faces but not so much out of evil desires as personal insecurity and basic survival needs. He was an outcast feared by virtually everyone for his ability to change his face. This in turn made him "cold and cruel", so he began to abuse others out of retribution and to compensate for his personal crisis. He was captured by Skeletor, who intended to recruit him as a henchman. However, because he was not really evil, he had no desire to join Skeletor. For this reason, he was forced into fighting He-Man against his will when his monster face was controlled by Beast Man's power. He-Man believed that Man-E-Faces was not a villain, and the Sorceress agreed, so with urging from He-Man, the Sorceress used her magic to help Man-E-Faces overcome Skeletor's influence. Grateful for their help, he returned the favor by helping to thwart Skeletor's attack on Castle Grayskull. After telling them his story, feeling he had at last found the friendship and kindness he needed.

The cartoon's version of the character uses his faces more for the purpose of acting rather than anything significant to battles. He is only used in one subsequent episode, "The Shadow of Skeletor", in which he uses his acting abilities to impersonate Beast Man, going undercover in a "Beast Man" disguise to spy on the Evil Warriors. Although initially conceived as one of the main characters of the franchise, he only makes two appearances in the Filmation cartoon series. 

The original script for the second season episode "Into the Abyss" was to feature a third appearance in the show by Man-E-Faces. In this episode, he would be rehearsing for a play in a scene in which Ram-Man was made to read out the part of Man-E-Faces' love interest, but the appearance was dropped before production.

2002 series
Man-E-Faces is featured in the 2002 relaunch of the Masters of the Universe toy line, and its accompanying cartoon series. His character was substantially developed from the old version; he is depicted as part of the regular team of warriors who aid He-Man, and his appearances are significantly more frequent.

Although the new series stuck with Filmation's portrayal of him as an actor, the writers developed him by giving him the ability to use his different faces for different techniques useful in battle. His monster face provides him with extra courage and strength, while his robot face provides him with extra intelligence and the ability to scan people and objects for important data. The new series also portrays him as a chess champion when using his robot face. He is frequently referred to as 'Man-E-Robot' or 'Man-E-Monster' when using these faces. He is also given a mace as a weapon, which he uses as Man-E-Faces and Man-E-Monster, but can change into a blaster when he becomes Man-E-Robot.

The episode "The Monster Within" gives him a split personality complex reminiscent of the original concept behind the character. This episode features his monster face falling under Beast Man's power over animals and attacking his fellow Masters. He subsequently feels guilty about what his weakness under Beast Man's powers has caused him to do, and he announces he will never play the role of the monster again. However, he later helps He-Man triumph by successfully struggling against the monster personality and retaining touch with his true self when Beast Man next attempts to put the monster under his power. Using his acting skills, he tricks Beast Man into thinking he has succeeded, before fending off the Evil Warriors.

Reception
Man-E-Faces has had a mostly mixed reception from critics. io9 voted Man-E-Faces the 3rd Least Masterful Masters of the Universe toy. Gizmodo ranked Man-E-Faces 7th best toy in Masters of the Universe.

References

Fictional characters introduced in 1983
Fictional androids
Fictional cyborgs
Fictional characters with dissociative identity disorder
Fictional actors
Masters of the Universe Heroic Warriors
Male characters in animated series